Hush is a 2008 British horror film about a young couple on a motorway journey who are drawn into a game of cat and mouse with a truck driver following a near accident. The film is directed by former BBC Radio 1 DJ, Mark Tonderai, and stars William Ash and Christine Bottomley. The film was produced by Warp X, UK Film Council and Film4 who supplied the funding for the film. The film was distributed by Optimum Releasing.

Plot
Zakes (William Ash) and his girlfriend Beth (Christine Bottomley) are travelling along the M1 motorway at night, bickering over the fragility of their strained relationship. While Beth is asleep, a large white truck overtakes Zakes and its tailgate momentarily slides up, revealing a naked woman, bound and bloodied in a cage, screaming for help. He immediately calls 999 but is unable to provide a number plate as it is covered in dirt.

Zakes follows the truck and, when they come to a standstill in a queue of traffic, he gets out and goes to the truck, managing to slide his hand under the tailgate to take a photograph using Beth's mobile phone. It appears to be nothing more than a white blur from the flash but Zakes later suspects it could be a hand. When the traffic starts moving, Zakes is unable to follow the truck, making Beth furious, claiming he never takes responsibility for anything.

They stop at a service station; Beth ends their relationship and tells Zakes she will find her own way home. Back at the car, Zakes sees the truck pull up, and watches a man in a dark hooded jacket go inside. Zakes follows to try and find Beth but she is nowhere to be seen. He alerts two security men about her disappearance but they do not believe him. Zakes later finds Beth's necklace in the car park. Believing she has been taken by the man in the truck, he decides to follow it, but upon returning to his car, finds his tyre has been punctured by a group of rowdy football fans. Zakes steals a car from a woman getting fuel at the station.

Meanwhile, one of the security guards decides to look through the CCTV footage. He sees Beth entering the station by herself and sees that she leaves through the back door with a man in a hooded jacket. Suddenly, he is killed by the other security guard who is revealed to be connected with the kidnappings. Zakes follows the truck to a site that is full of identical white trucks. A police officer arrives and arrests Zakes, believing he is trespassing. Zakes begs the officer to check all of the vehicles before they go. When the officer does, he is killed by the hooded man.

Zakes manages to escape from the police car and flees back to his car. Suddenly, a distraught woman appears claiming she has been kidnapped. He lets her in and drives to a nearby house in order to call for help. The elderly couple living there cautiously invite them in; the bloodied woman offers to call the police but cuts the phone line beforehand, revealing she too is part of the plan. She cuts the power in the house, kills the elderly couple and then attacks Zakes. He wakes up with his hands nailed to the floorboards. When he manages to get free, a fight ensues; Zakes overpowers her and finally kills her by stabbing her in the eye with one of the nails.

Zakes goes back to the truck site and finds Beth chained up in a cage outside. She tells Zakes the keys are with the man who is showering inside. Zakes goes inside and finds several other women locked up and gagged; it is revealed they are being used for human trafficking. Zakes manages to retrieve the keys and returns to Beth to help her escape first, but they hear the man coming and Zakes is forced to flee. A cat-and-mouse game begins when he realises Zakes is hiding on the site somewhere. He calls the woman's phone, which Zakes has on him, and follows the ring to where he is. However, Zakes has left the phone on the seat in an empty truck and is hiding in the forklift nearby. When the man steps into the right spot, Zakes pushes a button and the crane releases a heavy load onto the attacker, killing him.

One year later, at a service station, a man is seen picking out a book titled Traffic a non-fiction novel written by Zakes based on the events that he and Beth experienced. The driver is revealed to be the security guard who killed his partner earlier in the film. He purchases the book, goes out to his truck (a white truck identical to the killers' truck) and drives off.

Cast

References

External links
 
 

2008 films
2008 horror films
2000s horror thriller films
2000s road movies
British chase films
British horror thriller films
British road movies
Films about kidnapping
Films directed by Mark Tonderai
Film4 Productions films
Trucker films
2008 directorial debut films
2000s English-language films
2000s British films
English-language horror films